The 2020 Major League Baseball postseason was the playoff tournament of Major League Baseball for the 2020 season. Due to the COVID-19 pandemic, the league played only a 60-game season, and an expanded 16-team postseason tournament began on September 29, with games of all but the first round being played at neutral sites. A new 3-game Wild Card series was added as the opening round of this postseason due to the shortened season caused by the pandemic, it would become a permanent addition to the postseason format starting in 2022.

The postseason began on September 29, and ended on October 27. The World Series began on October 20 at Globe Life Field in Arlington, and ended on October 27, with the Los Angeles Dodgers defeating the Tampa Bay Rays in six games to win their first title since 1988. It was the Dodgers' seventh title in franchise history.

Playoff seeds
The following teams qualified for the postseason:

American League
 Tampa Bay Rays - 40–20, Clinched AL East
 Oakland Athletics - 36–24, Clinched AL West
 Minnesota Twins - 36–24, Clinched AL Central
 Cleveland Indians - 35–25
 New York Yankees - 33–27
 Houston Astros - 29–31
 Chicago White Sox - 35–25
 Toronto Blue Jays - 32–28

National League
 Los Angeles Dodgers - 43–17, Clinched NL West
 Atlanta Braves - 35–25, Clinched NL East
 Chicago Cubs - 34–26, Clinched NL Central
 San Diego Padres - 37–23
 St. Louis Cardinals - 30–28
 Miami Marlins - 31–29
 Cincinnati Reds - 31–29
 Milwaukee Brewers - 29–31

Playoff bracket

American League Wild Card

(1) Tampa Bay Rays vs. (8) Toronto Blue Jays 

The Rays swept the Blue Jays to advance to the ALDS.

(2) Oakland Athletics vs. (7) Chicago White Sox 

The Athletics defeated the White Sox to advance to the ALDS. This was the first playoff series win by the Athletics since 2006.

(3) Minnesota Twins vs. (6) Houston Astros 

The Astros swept the Twins to advance to the ALDS. With the series loss, the Twins' playoff game losing streak had been extended to 18 games.

(4) Cleveland Indians vs. (5) New York Yankees 

This was the fifth postseason meeting between these two teams. The Yankees swept the Indians to advance to the ALDS.

National League Wild Card

(1) Los Angeles Dodgers vs. (8) Milwaukee Brewers 

This was the second postseason meeting between the Dodgers and Brewers. The first was the 2018 NLCS, which Los Angeles won in seven games. The Dodgers swept the series to advance to the NLDS.

(2) Atlanta Braves vs. (7) Cincinnati Reds 

This was the second postseason meeting between the Reds and Braves. They last met in the 1995 NLCS, which the Braves won in a sweep. The Braves once again swept the Reds to advance to the NLDS.

(3) Chicago Cubs vs. (6) Miami Marlins 

This was the second postseason meeting between the Marlins and Cubs. The first was the 2003 NLCS, which the Marlins won in seven games. The Marlins swept the Cubs to return to the NLDS for the first time since 2003.

(4) San Diego Padres vs. (5) St. Louis Cardinals

This was the fourth postseason meeting between the Padres and Cardinals. The Padres earned their first playoff series win against the Cardinals in three games, advancing to the NLDS for the first time since 2006.

American League Division Series

(1) Tampa Bay Rays vs. (5) New York Yankees 

The Rays defeated the Yankees in five games to advance to the ALCS for the first time since 2008.

(2) Oakland Athletics vs. (6) Houston Astros 

The Astros upset the Athletics in four games to advance to the ALCS for the fourth year in a row.

National League Division Series

(1) Los Angeles Dodgers vs. (4) San Diego Padres 

This was the first postseason meeting in this history of the Padres-Dodgers rivalry, as well as the first postseason series to feature two California teams since the 2002 World Series. The Dodgers swept the Padres to advance to the NLCS for the third time in the past five years.

(2) Atlanta Braves vs. (6) Miami Marlins 

The Braves swept the Marlins to advance to the NLCS for the first time since 2001. This was the first playoff series loss by the Marlins in franchise history, previously they had went undefeated through the postseason field in 1997 and 2003.< ref>Marlins lose first playoff series in franchise history as surprising 2020 run ends in NLDS sweep, CBS Sports, October 8, 2020</ref>

American League Championship Series

(1) Tampa Bay Rays vs. (6) Houston Astros 

This was the second postseason meeting between the Rays and Astros. They last met in the 2019 ALDS, which the Astros won in five games. The Astros became the second team in MLB history to overcome a 3–0 series deficit to force a Game 7 in a postseason series, the last team to do so were the Boston Red Sox in the 2004 ALCS. However, the Rays managed to hold on and win Game 7, advancing to the World Series for the first time since 2008.

National League Championship Series

(1) Los Angeles Dodgers vs. (2) Atlanta Braves 

This was the fourth postseason meeting between the Braves and Dodgers. The previous three match-ups were the 1996 NLDS, 2013 NLDS, and 2018 NLDS, with Atlanta winning the former and Los Angeles winning the latter two. The Dodgers overcame a 3–1 series deficit to defeat the Braves in seven games and return to the World Series for the third time in the past four years.

Both teams would meet again in the 2021 NLCS, which the Braves won in six games en route to a World Series title. As of 2023, this is the last time the Dodgers won the NL pennant.

2020 World Series

(AL1) Tampa Bay Rays vs. (NL1) Los Angeles Dodgers 

This was the first World Series ever played at a neutral site. The Dodgers defeated the Rays in six games to win their first World Series title since 1988 and seventh overall. 

Both teams would split the first two games. while the Dodgers won Game 3 by a 6-2 score to take a 2-1 series lead. In Game 4, the Rays scored two runs in the bottom of the ninth to even the series at two games each due to an error committed by the Dodgers’ Max Muncy. The Dodgers won Game 5 by a 4-2 score to come within one game of the title. In Game 6, the Rays held a 1-0 lead until the bottom of the sixth inning when Rays’ manager Kevin Cash removed starting pitcher Blake Snell from the mound and replaced him with relief pitcher Nick Anderson. The decision proved to be fatal for the Rays, as the Dodgers scored three unanswered runs in the bottom of the sixth and eighth innings to secure the title. 

With the win, the Greater Los Angeles area had both NBA and MLB champions in the same season or calendar year, as the Los Angeles Lakers won the 2020 NBA Finals as well. This was the first time since 1988 that the Dodgers and Lakers brought championships to Los Angeles in the same season or calendar year - during that year, the Dodgers defeated the Oakland Athletics in the World Series, while the Lakers defeated the Detroit Pistons in seven games in the NBA Finals.

References

External links
 League Baseball Standings & Expanded Standings - 2020

 
Major League Baseball postseason